Joaquim Claude Gonçalves Araújo (born 9 April 1994), known as Gonçalves, is a Portuguese professional footballer who plays for Bulgarian club PFC Ludogorets Razgrad as a defensive midfielder.

Club career

Ajaccio
Born in Propriano, Corsica of Portuguese descent, Gonçalves came through local AC Ajaccio's youth system. He made his Ligue 1 debut on 21 September 2013, coming on as a 46th-minute substitute for Jean-Baptiste Pierazzi in a 2–0 away loss against Stade Rennais FC. 

Gonçalves contributed 23 games – 14 starts – in his first season, but the club returned to Ligue 2 after finishing in 20th and last position.

Tondela
On 20 June 2016, Gonçalves signed a two-year contract with C.D. Tondela of the Portuguese Primeira Liga. He first appeared in the competition on 13 August, playing 34 minutes in a 0–2 home defeat to S.L. Benfica.

Gonçalves appeared in 58 competitive matches during his spell at the Estádio João Cardoso.

Troyes
On 30 August 2018, Gonçalves joined French second-tier side Troyes AC on a two-year deal. His maiden league appearance took place on 26 October, when he replaced Yoann Salmier midway through the second half of the 2–0 away victory over Grenoble Foot 38.

Gil Vicente
Gonçalves returned to the Portuguese top flight in summer 2019, agreeing to a contract at Gil Vicente FC. He scored his first goal for the club on 19 October, closing the 2–0 defeat of F.C. Penafiel in the third round of the Taça de Portugal. His first in the league came two months later, at home with Vitória de Guimarães (2–2).

Ludogorets
In May 2021, Gonçalves joined PFC Ludogorets Razgrad of the First Professional Football League, with the deal being made effective on 1 July. He won the Bulgarian Supercup on 17 July after beating PFC CSKA Sofia 4–0, and at the end of his debut campaign was also crowned national champion.

International career
Gonçalves won the first of his five caps for the Portugal under-20 team during the 2014 Toulon Tournament, featuring the full 90 minutes in the 2–0 group stage win over Mexico.

Honours
Ludogorets Razgrad
First Professional Football League (Bulgaria): 2021–22
Bulgarian Supercup: 2021, 2022

References

External links

National team data 

1994 births
Living people
French people of Portuguese descent
French footballers
Portuguese footballers
Association football midfielders
Ligue 1 players
Ligue 2 players
Championnat National 3 players
AC Ajaccio players
ES Troyes AC players
Primeira Liga players
C.D. Tondela players
Gil Vicente F.C. players
First Professional Football League (Bulgaria) players
PFC Ludogorets Razgrad players
Portugal youth international footballers
Portuguese expatriate footballers
Expatriate footballers in Bulgaria
Portuguese expatriate sportspeople in Bulgaria